That's the Way Love Goes is the 38th studio album by the American country singer Merle Haggard backed by The Strangers, released in 1983.

Background
Haggard had loved Lefty Frizzell's "That's the Way Love Goes" since he first heard the song and tried recording it towards the end of his time with Capitol Records in the mid-1970s with unsatisfactory results. That version, which can be found on the box set Hag: The Studio Recordings 1969-1976, is more lighthearted and whimsical than the one Haggard recorded in 1983. The song topped the Billboard country singles chart, as did "Someday When Things Are Good," a song co-written by Haggard and his wife Leona Williams. It also proved to be prophetic, as the couple divorced that year. Williams had also written Haggard's recent hit "You Take Me For Granted", but Williams, who replaced Haggard's previous wife Bonnie Owens in the Strangers, had creative aspirations of her own that were not always appreciated by her husband. As Haggard wrote in his 1981 autobiography Sing Me Back Home, "I'd reached the point in my career where I felt in charge of my music...When Leona tried to make a suggestion, I resented it. She resented my resentment. So it went. She kept saying she felt like an outsider...I couldn't understand why she got so upset by the press leaning toward good ol' Bonnie and the snide remarks about Leona coming in and breaking up my 'happy home.'" The divorce instigated a personal landslide for Haggard, who spent the rest of the decade losing himself in alcohol and drugs, although initially it did not prevent him from having #1 hits. As he recalled in his 1999 autobiography House of Memories, "I roared right through the 1980s, running and drugging the nights away, making bad decisions while under the influence of various substances." That's The Way Love Goes was his third hit LP for Epic in two years, not counting two separate duet albums with George Jones and Willie Nelson. While discussing his own song "Bad Boy" in the liner notes to Great Days: The John Prine Anthology, John Prine admitted, "Around that time, I fell under the spell of Merle Haggard's songwriting. There was a period there when he just seemed to be churning out some really great stuff. He was bringing out great albums every six or eight months, and I considered 'Bad Boy' sort of in the vein of what he was doing."

Overall, That's The Way Love Goes offers a more laid back feel than Haggard's later LPs, demonstrating the his emotive vocal range on several ballads like "What Am I Gonna Do (With the Rest of My Life)", which peaked at number 3 and appears to reflect the turmoil with Williams, as does the lilting yet bitter "If You Hated Me". Other tracks have the bright pop sound that was becoming more predominate on country albums in the 1980s, such as "I'm Carrying Fire" and the jazzy "The Last Boat of the Day". The album's closing track, "I Think I'll Stay", sounds like an after hours blues jam as Haggard croons, "Think I'll stay around till I'm sick of home sweet home..." The album peaked at number 8 on the Billboard country albums chart.

Reception

Matt Fink of AllMusic rated the album "another decent collection of laidback ballads that lets Haggard display some of the full range of his vocal talents". John Morthland of Amazon.com, wrote, "Here's one of the great, lost Haggard albums... The tone is bleak, funereal, without a single uptempo stomp to break up the succession of one beautiful, heartbreaking ballad after another." At the Grammy Awards of 1985, That's the Way Love Goes won the Grammy Award for Best Male Country Vocal Performance.

That's the Way Love Goes was reissued on CD by DCC Compact Classics in 2000, and reissued again with Going Where the Lonely Go on CD by S & P Records in 2005.

Track listing
"What Am I Gonna Do (With the Rest of My Life)" (Merle Haggard) – 3:35
"(I'm Gonna Paint Me) A Bed of Roses" (Haggard, Bobby Whitson) – 2:11
"Someday When Things Are Good" (Haggard, Leona Williams) – 3:38
"That's the Way Love Goes" (Lefty Frizzell, Sanger D. Shafer) – 3:04
"Carryin' Fire" (Red Lane, Jim Ray, Sam Beck) – 2:55
"Don't Seem Like We've Been Together All Our Lives" (Haggard) – 2:56
"If You Hated Me" (Haggard, Lane, Dean Holloway) – 2:42
"Love Will Find You" (Haggard) – 2:36
"The Last Boat of the Day" (Hank Cochran, Red Lane) – 3:40
"I Think I'll Stay" (Haggard) – 4:43

Personnel
Merle Haggard– vocals, guitar

The Strangers:
Roy Nichols – guitar
Norm Hamlet – steel guitar
Tiny Moore – fiddle, mandolin
Mark Yeary – keyboards
Dennis Hromek – bass guitar
Biff Adams – drums
Jimmy Belken – fiddle
Don Markham – horns

with:
Dave Kirby – guitar
Red Lane – guitar

and:
Reggie Young – guitar
Greg Galbraith – guitar
Glenn Martin – guitar
Bobby Wood – keyboards
Mike Leach – bass guitar
Gene Chrisman – drums
Kenny Malone – drums
Terry McMillan – harmonica

Charts

Weekly charts

Year-end charts

References

1983 albums
Merle Haggard albums
Epic Records albums
Albums produced by Ray Baker (music producer)